Sepiola pfefferi is a species of bobtail squid native to the northeastern Atlantic Ocean. Specifically, it occurs on the continental shelf off the Faroe Islands and from southern Norway to Brittany in France. The depth range of this species is unknown.

Female S. pfefferi are on average slightly larger than males. They grow to 13 mm and 12 mm in mantle length, respectively.

The type specimen was collected in the North Sea and is deposited in the Zoology Collection of the Natural History Museum, Berlin.

The validity of S. pfefferi has been questioned.

References

External links

Bobtail squid
Molluscs of the Atlantic Ocean
Marine molluscs of Europe
Taxa named by Georg Grimpe